The Federal Office Building (Omaha, Nebraska), also known as the Old Federal Building, is a thirteen story, stripped classical style building with Art Deco elements located in downtown Omaha, Nebraska. The building was designed and built in 1933-34 by architects Thomas R. Kimball, William L. Steele, and Josiah D. Sandham as part of the firm Kimball, Steele & Sandham, plus associated architect George B. Prinz. It was built on the site of first U.S Courthouse and Post Office.

Part of the New Deal building program, the structure's original occupants were all federal agencies including the US Weather Bureau, the Internal Revenue Service (IRS), the Department of Agriculture, Civil Service Commission, Customs Service, Army, and Navy. The federal District Court for Nebraska met here until the late 1950s or early 1960s. The US Army Corps of Engineers was the last federal agency officed here, and subsequent to their departure in July 2008, it has not been in use by the federal government. Though not substantiated by the FBI, the building was allegedly examined by Timothy McVeigh in 1995, prior to his involvement in the Oklahoma City Bombing.

In December 2011, the building was sold to developers who plan on opened a 152-room Residence Inn by Marriott. The exterior facade will remain the same as will some of the interior 1930s features such as terrazzo marble floors. The $23 million project is expected to be completed by 2013.

References

External links

 Emporis.com.
Historic Federal Courthouses from the Federal Judicial Center

Federal buildings in the United States
Buildings and structures in Omaha, Nebraska
Art Deco architecture in Nebraska